Nikola Paunic (born October 13, 1993) is a Canadian soccer player.

Career

Youth & College
Paunic played two years of college soccer at the University of Toronto, before transferring to the University of South Florida in 2013. He played in the Canadian Soccer League with the Serbian White Eagles.

Paunic also appeared for USL PDL side K-W United FC in 2014.

Professional
On January 20, 2015, Paunic was selected 74th overall in the 2015 MLS SuperDraft by Vancouver Whitecaps FC.

Paunic wasn't signed by Vancouver and joined United Soccer League side Orange County Blues on June 2, 2015.

Managerial career 
Paunic became a coach for the Stella Rossa Football Club Academy in the Ontario Academy Soccer League.

References

External links
 
 

1993 births
Living people
Footballers from Podgorica
People from Sokolac
Canadian soccer players
South Florida Bulls men's soccer players
K-W United FC players
Orange County SC players
Association football defenders
USL Championship players
USL League Two players
Vancouver Whitecaps FC draft picks
Toronto FC players
Serbian White Eagles FC players
Canadian people of Serbian descent
Canada men's youth international soccer players
Canadian Soccer League (1998–present) players
Toronto Varsity Blues soccer players